Lisa I. Iezzoni (born 1954) is an American medical researcher with expertise in health policy. She is a professor at Harvard Medical School, as well as the director of the Mongan Institute for Health Policy at Massachusetts General Hospital. She is known for her research on health disparities among people with disabilities.

Education
Iezzoni attended the Harvard School of Public Health in the 1970s, from which she received a master's degree in health policy. She went on to enroll in Harvard Medical School, only to be diagnosed with multiple sclerosis in her first year as a student there. She received her M.D. from Harvard Medical School in 1984. She subsequently decided to become a medical researcher instead of a practicing doctor, because of the difficulties associated with practicing medicine with a disability at the time (the Americans with Disabilities Act had not yet been passed).

Career
Iezzoni served as an assistant professor at Boston University School of Medicine, while also working in the  Health Care Research Unit there. For sixteen years, she was director of research at Beth Israel Deaconess Medical Center, where she became the first woman affiliated with the center to be appointed a professor at Harvard Medical School. In 2006, she became the associate director of Massachusetts General Hospital's Partners Institute for Health Policy (since renamed the Mongan Institute for Health Policy), and became its director in 2009. One of the students she mentored at Harvard Medical School was Cheri Blauwet. She wrote When Walking Fails, Mobility Problems of Adults with Chronic Conditions.

Selected publications 
 Rosemarie Garland-Thomson & Lisa I. Iezzoni (2021) Disability Cultural Competence for All as a Model, The American Journal of Bioethics, 21:9, 26–28, 
 Lisa I. Iezzoni, Sowmya R. Rao, Julie Ressalam, Dragana Bolcic-Jankovic, Karen Donelan, Nicole Agaronnik, Tara Lagu, Eric G. Campbell,  Use of Accessible Weight Scales and Examination Tables/Chairs for Patients with Significant Mobility Limitations by Physicians Nationwide,  The Joint Commission Journal on Quality and Patient Safety, Volume 47, Issue 10, 2021, Pages 615–626, 
 Lisa I. Iezzoni, Opening Doors For People With Disability.  Health Affairs 2021 40:4, 677–678. 
 Iezzoni, L. I., & O'Day, B. (2006). More than ramps: A guide to improving health care quality and access for people with disabilities. Oxford University Press. 
 Iezzoni, L. I. (2013). Risk adjustment for measuring health care outcomes. Health Administration Press. 
 Souza, A., Kelleher, A., Cooper, R., Cooper, R. A., Iezzoni, L. I., & Collins, D. M. (2010). Multiple sclerosis and mobility-related assistive technology: Systematic Review of Literature. The Journal of Rehabilitation Research and Development, 47(3), 213.

Honors and awards
In 1996, Iezzoni received an Investigator Award in Health Policy Research from the Robert Wood Johnson Foundation. In 2000, she was named a member of the Institute of Medicine. She has served on the National Quality Forum's board of directors,  and has received the American College of Medical Quality's Founder's Award for Outstanding Contributions to the Field. She was also included in a National Institutes of Health exhibit on American women physicians who are "changing the face of medicine".

References

Living people
1954 births
American medical researchers
Women medical researchers
American women scientists
People with multiple sclerosis
Harvard Medical School faculty
Members of the National Academy of Medicine
Massachusetts General Hospital faculty
Harvard School of Public Health alumni
Harvard Medical School alumni
Boston University faculty
American women academics
21st-century American women